Nashipur is a village in the Murshidabad-Jiaganj CD block in the Lalbag subdivision of Murshidabad district in West Bengal, India.

Geography

Location

The Namak Haram Deorhi, Jafarganj Cemetery, House of Jagat Seth , Kathgola Palace and Tomb of Azimunissa Begum are all located nearby. One can reach the temple town of Rani Bhavani at Baranagar, on the other side of the Bhagirathi, by country boat from Ajimganj.

Note: The map alongside presents some of the notable locations in the subdivisions. All places marked in the map are linked in the larger full screen map.

Nashipur Rajbari

Nashipur Rajbari of the Nashipur Raj Family is situated in Nashipur next to the old palace built by Raja Debi Singha. The current palace was built by Raja Kirti Chandra Singha Bahadur in 1865. It was the court of the Debi Singha, who is historically renowned for being the tax collector during the British Raj. He came from Panipat and started as a trader. After a trial, he succeeded in getting an appointment in the Revenue Department under Dewan Reza Khan. He was known for being strict against those who failed to pay taxes on time to him. Gradually, he was able to exert his influence among the people of the East India Company and became head of that department. Debi Singha was also the founder of the Nashipur Raj Family.

Nashipur picture gallery

Nashipur Akhara
Nashipur Akhara is situated close to the Nashipur Rajbari on the east of the Bhagirathi River. The motto of the Akhra is to remain a bachelor for one's life. It is actually here where every year Jhulan Yatra and the famous fair is held. People from far off assemble here to witness the dramas held on this auspicious occasion. In the Nashipur Akhra very old articles like huge utensils and even a vintage car is kept in a small room rather garage, but none of them have proper maintenance. However, it is free for public analysis.

Nashipur Akhara picture gallery

References

See also

 Nashipur Rail Bridge

Villages in Murshidabad district